Jip Cornelis Willem Molenaar (born 15 November 2001) is a Dutch professional footballer who plays as a defender for Eerste Divisie club SC Telstar. He is the son of former professional footballer Keje Molenaar and brother-in-law of Juventus defender Matthijs de Ligt.

References

2001 births
Living people
Dutch footballers
People from Zaanstad
Footballers from North Holland
Association football defenders
FC Volendam players
Eintracht Frankfurt players
SC Telstar players
Eerste Divisie players
Tweede Divisie players